Atlas is an unincorporated community in Lamar County, in the U.S. state of Texas. It has a population of 20 people.

History
Atlas was laid out in 1884, and named after Atlas, a deity who held up the celestial sphere. A post office was established at Atlas in 1884, and remained in operation until 1943.

References

Unincorporated communities in Lamar County, Texas
Unincorporated communities in Texas